Amethi is a constituency of the Uttar Pradesh Legislative Assembly, that covers the city of Amethi in the Amethi district of Uttar Pradesh, India. It is one of the five assembly constituencies which fall under Amethi Lok Sabha constituency.

Currently, this seat is represented by Samajwadi party politician Mahraji Devi, who won the last Assembly election.

Sanjay Singh has been a major player in the local politics. His father, Rananjay Singh, was elected from this seat. Later Sanjay Singh himself, his first wife Garima Singh, and his second wife Ameeta Singh have all been elected from the constituency.

Members of Vidhan Sabha

Election results

2022 

 1951: Kunwer Rananjai Singh (IND)  21,536 votes. Defeated Baijnath Singh (INC)  7,835 votes.
 1957: Rama Kant Singh (INC) defeated Bijai Pal (Independent)  
 1962: Vaidya Baij Nath Singh (INC) defeated Ram Bali (Ind)  
 1967	R. P. Singh (BJS) defeated Baij Nath Singh Vaidya (INC)  
 1969: Raja Rananjaya Singh (Bharatiya Jana Sangh), defeated Baij Nath Singh Vaidya (INC) 
 1974: Raja Rananjai Singh  (INC) defeated Ravindra Pratap Singh (BJS)  
 1977: Haricharan Yadav (Janata Party) 18,304 votes. Defeated Baij Nath Singh Vaidya (INC) 
 1980: Rajkumar Sanjay Singh (Congress-Indira) defeated Hari Charan JNP(SC)  
 1996:	Ram Harsh Singh (INC) 36,069 votes. Defeated Jamuna Prasad Mishra (BJP) : 31,870 
 2002: Amita Singh (BJP)  55,949 votes. Defeated Ashish (INC)  37,184 votes.
 2007: Amita Singh (INC)  48,108 votes. Defeated Ashish (BSP)  35,684 votes.
 2012: Gayatri Prasad Prajapati (Samajwadi Party) 58,434 votes. Defeated Ameeta Sinh (INC)  49,674 votes
 2017: Garima Singh (BJP) 64,226 votes defeated Gayatri Prajapati of SP, third placed Ram Ji of BSP, and fourth placed Ameeta Sinh of Congress

References

External links
 

Assembly constituencies of Uttar Pradesh
Amethi